The John Goss Special was a limited edition of the Ford Falcon released by Ford Australia in August 1975 to commemorate John Goss' win in the prestigious Bathurst 1000 endurance race the previous year.

The car was based on the XB Falcon 500 Hardtop and featured a 302 in³ (4.9 L) Cleveland V8, and some specific options including the GS Rally Pack which featured full dash instrumentation, a 3-spoke steering wheel, vented bonnet (hood) with locking pins, and 12-slot steel road wheels. A separate item featured on all John Goss Special hardtops were the cosmetic side body vents that were also a feature of contemporary Falcon GT hardtops.

The John Goss Special cars were available in a choice of two accent colours, Apollo Blue metallic or Emerald Fire (green) metallic, offset against the predominant body colour of Polar White. The metallic paint (specified on the cars' compliance plates) covered the bonnet, engine bay, chassis, and feature sections on the 'A' pillar and waistline, as well as the lower sill sections and the rear feature panel between the tail-lights. Unlike other GS Rally Pack cars, the road wheels were painted in complementary Polar White, as were the bumper bars and the front grille assembly. Interior trim was white vinyl, contrasted against a black dashboard and black floor carpet.

A factory Dealer Bulletin (dated 30 July 1975) released to Ford dealers stated that all "minor Falcon 500 options" were available to order on the John Goss Special, and there is evidence of some cars featuring a Limited Slip Differential. The 302ci V8 was the only available engine, but this could be had with either a 4-speed manual or 3-speed automatic floor-mounted transmission. A central floor Sports Console was a specified mandatory option, as was Sports Handling Suspension with 185 section steel-belted radial tyres.

Some Ford dealers such as McLeod Ford in Sydney (well-known at the time for their Horn cars) chose to add accessories such as front and rear spoilers, and/or to modify the interior seating to feature colourful cloth or vinyl inserts.

Exactly how many John Goss Special cars were built remains unknown, as Ford never released production figures, and the cars are recorded collectively in the official records as Falcon 500 Hardtop builds. However, amongst surviving JGS cars, it is clear that the build dates span July 1975 to November 1975 inclusive. Estimates recorded in the general media place their numbers anywhere between 260 and 800, with Sports Car World magazine (December 1975) suggesting that Ford made an initial build of 400 units that sold out quickly and that a second run of cars was then commenced. Motor Manual magazine (January 1976) also mentions the situation of a second build run. The John Goss Special has become popular among 'Australian muscle car' collectors despite not gaining the press or publicity of other limited edition Falcon cars such as the GT-HO (1969-1971) and the Cobra (1978).

References

External links
JohnGossSpecial.com - Home of the JGS registry (Dead link) As archived at web.archive.org on 13 March 2008
AussieCoupes.com - Australian Falcon information

Ford Falcon
Muscle cars
Coupés
Cars of Australia
Rear-wheel-drive vehicles
Cars introduced in 1975